Anatoly Ivanovich Gribkov (March 23, 1919 – February 12, 2008) was at Soviet Army High Command during the Cold War era. Gribkov was born in the village of Dukhovoye (now in Liskinsky District of Voronezh Oblast), Russian SFSR on March 23, 1919, to father Ivan Vasilyevich Gribkov and mother Serafima Kuzminichna Gribkova. He had six brothers and three sisters.

Education
When he was older, he attended the J. V. Stalin Armored Troops School, from which he graduated early, and later graduated from the Soviet General Staff Academy with an honours degree and a gold medal.

Historic events
General Anatoly Gribkov played minor but important roles during the events of the Cuban Missile Crisis and Checkpoint Charlie.

He later commanded the Leningrad Military District and, until his retirement in 1989, was the Chief of Staff of the Warsaw Treaty. Gribkov died in Moscow on February 12, 2008.

References

1919 births
2008 deaths
People from Liskinsky District
Central Committee of the Communist Party of the Soviet Union members
Eighth convocation members of the Soviet of the Union
Ninth convocation members of the Soviet of the Union
Tenth convocation members of the Soviet of Nationalities
Eleventh convocation members of the Soviet of Nationalities
Army generals (Soviet Union)
Soviet military personnel of the Winter War
Soviet military personnel of World War II
Recipients of the Order of Lenin
Recipients of the Order of the Red Banner
Burials in Troyekurovskoye Cemetery
Frunze Military Academy alumni
Military Academy of the General Staff of the Armed Forces of the Soviet Union alumni